Charles E. Inslee (1870 – September 1922) was an American actor. He appeared in 127 films between 1908 and 1921.

Biography
Born in New York City, Inslee was the son of Mr. and Mrs. Robert C. Inslee of Jamaica Plain, Massachusetts.

Inslee debuted on stage in 1892 as an understudy in Boston in the Grand Opera House Company's production of Rosedale. He first acted in films in 1908, and found work with the Edison, Biograph, Bison and Kalem studios.

In 1893, Inslee married actress Belle Stokes while the two were performing with the Grand Opera House Company.

Inslee died in September 1922.

Selected filmography

References

External links

1870 births
1922 deaths
Burials at Green-Wood Cemetery
American male film actors
American male silent film actors
20th-century American male actors